Oleksandr Viktorovych Bandura (30 May 1986) is a Ukrainian professional footballer who plays as a goalkeeper for Mynai.

Career
He previously played for Tavriya Simferopol in the Ukrainian Premier League, joining in February 2008. He also played for FC Metalurh Donetsk.

References

External links
 
 
 
 Profile on Official Tavriya Website

1986 births
Living people
Ukrainian footballers
Association football goalkeepers
FC Spartak Sumy players
PFC Sumy players
FC Krymteplytsia Molodizhne players
SC Tavriya Simferopol players
FC Metalurh Donetsk players
FC Stal Kamianske players
NK Veres Rivne players
FC Lviv players
FC Rukh Lviv players
FC Mynai players
Ukrainian Premier League players
Ukrainian First League players
Ukrainian Second League players
Sportspeople from Sumy Oblast
21st-century Ukrainian people